The 2017 Shanghai International Film Festival was the 20th such festival devoted to international cinema held in Shanghai, China.

International Jury
The members of the jury for the Golden Goblet Award were:

 Cristian Mungiu (Romanian director)
 Cao Baoping (Chinese director, screenwriter, producer)
 Li Qiang (Chinese screenwriter)
 Milcho Manchevski (USA/Macedonian director)
 Sabu (Japanese director)
 Gary Michael Walters (American producer)
 Xu Qing (Chinese actress)

In Competition

Winners

Golden Goblet Awards
 Best Feature Film: Pedicab by Paolo Villaluna
 Jury Grand Prix: Yellow by Mostafa Taghizad’h 
 Best Director: Maciej Pieprzyca for I'm a Killer  
 Best Actor: Huang Bo for The Conformist 
 Best Actress: Sareh Bayat for Yellow 
 Best Screenplay: Ivan Bolotnikov for Kharms 
 Best Cinematography: Shandor Berkeshi for Kharms 
 Artistic Contribution: Fault Condition by Cătălin Saizescu

Asian New Talent Awards
Best Film: Shuttle Life
Best Director: Takumi Saito - Blank 13
Best Script Writer: Wang Qiang - Sunshine that Can Move Mountains
Best Cinematographer: Chen Ko-chin - Shuttle Life
Best Actor: Jack Tan - Shuttle Life
Best Actress: Adwa Bolle - Beneath the Silence

Notes

References

External links
Official website

Shanghai International Film Festival
Shanghai International Film Festival
Shanghai
Shanghai
21st century in Shanghai